The history of lesbian, gay bisexual and transgender people in Thailand spans thousands of years. But because of ancient beliefs, homosexuality and homosexual relationships have been seen as an abnormality both socially and mentally. In the 20th century, LGBT people received more stringent legal regulations regarding their orientation, with restrictions being gradually eased by the beginning of the 21st century. However, activism for LGBT people has been slow in development due to government inaction.

Ancient 
Homosexuality has been documented in Thailand since the Ayutthaya period (1351 to 1767) .  ‘Samutthakhot Kham Chan’ (สมุทรโฆษคำฉันท์), Thai literature from Ayuttaya times, mentioned lesbian relationships between the concubines living in the royal palace. In the poem, the writer wrote about the concubines sleeping together, some of them have their breasts exposed, some of them embracing each other in their sleep.

Royal law in Borommatrailokkanat, King’s Reign states that if the concubines act or treat each other as lovers, they shall be whipped 50 times.

Rama I-VIII

Prince Kraison 
Prince Kraison, King Rama I’s son, had his own theatre group where all actors were male. Prince Kraison’s theatre group was known to be the most luxurious with all the expensive clothing and jewelry provided by prince Kraison to all the actors. These actors usually needed to dress up as females while performing and, with the support from Prince Kraison, they also dressed as females at public occasion like Loi Krathong festival.

According to the memorandum, Khun Thong (ขุนทอง) and Yaem (แย้ม) were two actors Prince Kraisorn adored the most, both Khun Thong and Yaem were patronized more than the rest of the actors. Prince Kraison never tried to cover up his sexuality and his preference. He unashamedly spent most of his time with these actors and usually spent the night with the actors in their home not in his palace, which was very uncommon for his position as a prince. This unusual behavior of Prince Kraison led to the investigation where the actors confessed to performing sexual interaction.

Princess Yuangkaeo Sirorot 

In 1956 homosexual relationships were common among the maids working and living in the Royal palace. Princess Yuangkaeo Sirorot, was involved in a relationship with Mom Rajawongse Wongthep (หม่อมราชวงศ์วงศ์เทพ), but Mom Rajawongse Wongthep already had a lover at the time, who was also a woman, named Lady Hun. Out of jealousy, Lady Hun started a false rumor saying Princess Yuangkaeo was so infatuated with Mom Rajawongse Wongthep that she gave all the jewelry she received from the queen to Mom Rajawongse Wongthep. The rumor started spreading all around Royal Palace. After the queen found out about this false accusation, she furiously banished Princess Yuangkaeo back to Chiang Mai as a punishment. Humiliated, Princess Yuangkaeo decided to consult with Princess Buachum, her friend at Chiang Mai.That night after Princess Buachum fell asleep, wanting to prove her innocence, Princess Yuangkaeo jumped down from the top of the palace. She later died at the hospital at the age of only 19.

Modern Thailand

LGBT and the Military 
In Thailand, all 21-year-old Thai men must partake in a lottery to determine whether they will become military conscripts, unless they have attended at least three years of reserved military training during high school or are considered unfit to serve. Men reporting for the military draft are classified into 4 groups according to their physical condition. The first is person with normal physique, the second is person whose physique is unlike persons in the previous category, the third is person with an illness which cannot be cured within 30 days, and the fourth is person whose illness is incompatible with military.

Transgender women are usually placed in the second category and treated significantly differently, as women are exempt from the military draft. Transgender women are automatically rejected and given an exemption document known as “Sor Dor 43” stamped with the wording “permanent mental disorder”. This makes it difficult for transgender women to apply for jobs in government, state enterprises or any companies which require proof of military service.

Due to high pressure from the LGBT community, in March 2006, the military agreed to change the wording but refused to revise any already given Sor Dor 43.

On 11 April 2012, new regulations were issued under the 1954 Military Service Act to use the term “gender identity disorder” in military service exemption. Following this, transgender persons can request a new Sor Dor 43 with the new wording.

Gender in legal documents 
On August 9, 2012 Mr (now Miss) Sirinlada Khodpad along with Dr. Taejing Siripanich, committee of National Human Rights Commission of Thailand, and his parents arrived at district office to file a request on changing title, marked the first legal title change in Thailand, but only for intersex person.

At the moment title changing for transgender citizens is still a controversial topic and has not yet been legalized.

Media 
In the past few years, higher visibility of LGBT acceptance is apparent such as in media : the growing numbers of television shows, dramas and movies concerning LGBT relationships and the increase in homosexual/LGBT characters’ airtime on television. LGBT artists/groups started appearing in media as well. Two of these groups, "4MIX" and "Venus Flytrap" are Thai-Pop groups with LGBT members.

Further reading 
 Busakorn Suriyasarn, Pride at work, 14 May 2015

References 

Thailand
Social history of Thailand